The Aktionsanalytische Organisation (AAO), commonly known as the Friedrichshof Commune, was an Austrian far-left commune in Friedrichshof outside Vienna. The organization was founded in 1972 by artist Otto Muehl and dissolved in 1990. AAO became an authoritarian sect, described as a "psycho sect" by authors Nordhausen and Billerbeck. AAO was devoted to a breakdown of established social habits and beliefs, partly inspired by ideas of Wilhelm Reich.

Muehl was subsequently convicted of widespread sexual abuse of minors who lived in the commune and sentenced to 7 years in prison.

References

Literature
Die Diktatur der `freien Sexualität´ Book with an extensive description, written by the former member Andreas Schlothauer, who played a leading role during the dissolution of the organization.

Far-left politics in Austria